Satish Kumar Chauhan was an Indian politician belonging to Indian National Congress. He was elected as a member of Madhya Pradesh Legislative Assembly from Bhainsdehi in 1985. He died on 29 March 2019 at the age of 58.

References

1960s births
2019 deaths
Indian National Congress politicians
Madhya Pradesh MLAs 1985–1990
Indian National Congress politicians from Madhya Pradesh